Renzo Renato Garcés Mori (born 12 June 1996) is a Peruvian professional footballer who plays as a centre-back for Peruvian Primera División club Universidad César Vallejo and the Peru national team.

Honours 
Universidad de San Martín

 Torneo del Inca runner-up: 2014

Sporting Cristal

 Torneo Descentralizado: 2018

References 

1996 births
Living people
People from Pucallpa
Peruvian footballers
Association football central defenders

Club Deportivo Universidad de San Martín de Porres players
Sporting Cristal footballers
Club Deportivo Universidad César Vallejo footballers
Peruvian Primera División players
Peru youth international footballers
Peru under-20 international footballers
Footballers at the 2015 Pan American Games
Pan American Games competitors for Peru
Peru international footballers